Maulvi Qudratullah Panjshiri is an Afghan Taliban politician who served as Governor of Panjshir province from September 2021 to June 2022.

References

Living people
Year of birth missing (living people)
Taliban governors
Governors of Panjshir Province